Jaime Gustavo Jaen Gutierrez (born October 4, 1978) is a Panamanian baseball player who has played on the Panama national baseball team.

In 2004, he played for Saim Rho in Serie A1, the highest level of professional baseball in Italy. He also participated in the 2005 Baseball World Cup (hitting .349), the  2006 COPABE Olympic Qualifier (hitting .160), the 2006 Central American and Caribbean Games (hitting .105) and the 2008 Americas Baseball Cup (hitting .333).

References

Living people
1978 births
Panamanian baseball players